"Rubberneckin'" is a song performed by Elvis Presley, which was recorded at American Sound Studio. It was used in the film Change of Habit and subsequently issued as the B-side of "Don't Cry Daddy" (RCA single 47–9768) in conjunction with the movie premiere. It reached number six in the United States on the Billboard Hot 100 in 1969.

Paul Oakenfold remix

In 2003, after the worldwide success of Dutch musician Junkie XL's remix of "A Little Less Conversation" a year before, English record producer Paul Oakenfold remixed "Rubberneckin'", and it was released as a single from the album Elvis 2nd to None. It peaked at number two in Canada, number three in Australia, and reached the top 10 in Denmark, Finland, Ireland, and the United Kingdom.

Track listings
Standard CD single
 "Rubberneckin'" (Paul Oakenfold remix radio edit) – 3:28
 "Rubberneckin'" (Paul Oakenfold remix 12-inch extended) – 5:19
 "Rubberneckin'" (original) – 2:09

12-inch single
A1. "Rubberneckin'" (Paul Oakenfold remix 12-inch extended) – 5:19
B1. "Rubberneckin'" (Paul Oakenfold remix radio edit) – 3:28
B2. "Rubberneckin'" (original) – 2:09

7-inch and European CD single
A. "Rubberneckin'" (Paul Oakenfold remix radio edit) – 3:28
B. "Rubberneckin'" (original) – 2:09

Charts

Weekly charts

Year-end charts

Release history

References

External links
  in Change of Habit
 

Elvis Presley songs
Paul Oakenfold songs
1969 singles
2003 singles
1969 songs
Bertelsmann Music Group singles
RCA Records singles
Song recordings produced by Paul Oakenfold